Polycera aurantiomarginata is a species of sea slug, a nudibranch, a marine gastropod mollusk in the family Polyceridae.

Distribution
This species of polycerid nudibranch was described from Spain. It is found on the west African coast as far south as Angola. It may be synonymous with the western Atlantic species Polycera chilluna.

Description
The body of Polycera aurantiomarginata is dark grey or black white with longitudinal yellow lines. The oral veil has six tapering yellow-tipped papillae. There is a broad orange line at the lower edge of the foot.

Ecology
Polycera aurantiomarginata feeds on a bryozoan.

References 

Polyceridae
Gastropods described in 1984